The 1949 U.S. Open was the 49th U.S. Open, held June 9–11 at Medinah Country Club in Medinah, Illinois, a suburb northwest of Chicago. Cary Middlecoff won the first of his two U.S. Open titles, one stroke ahead of runners-up Clayton Heafner and Sam Snead. For Snead, it was the third of four second-place finishes at the only major championship he never won. Middlecoff, a dentist, won his second U.S. Open in 1956.

Middlecoff began the championship with a 75, but rebounded with scores of 67-69 in the next two rounds to take a one-shot lead over Buck White after 54 holes. In the final round, Middlecoff was paired with Heafner, and the two exchanged the lead several times during the round. Heafner went ahead by one after the 11th, then double-bogeyed 12 to give Middlecoff the lead. After a Heafner birdie at 13, the two were tied again. Heafner then bogeyed 14 to fall one behind, a deficit he would not be able to overcome after missing a 6-footer for birdie at 18 that would have forced a Sunday playoff. Snead also had a chance to force a playoff with a birdie at the last, but his approach shot missed the green and he could only save par.

Byron Nelson, the 1939 champion, came out of retirement but missed the cut. He played the U.S. Open six years later in 1955, then retired for good. Two-time champion Ralph Guldahl played in his final U.S. Open. Defending champion Ben Hogan missed the tournament after being severely injured in an automobile accident in February. He returned the following year and won three of the next four U.S. Opens.

This was the first U.S. Open at Medinah, which returned in 1975 and 1990, both ending in 18-hole playoffs. It later hosted the PGA Championship in 1999 and 2006, both won by Tiger Woods, and the Ryder Cup in 2012.

Past champions in the field

Made the cut

Missed the cut 

Source:

Round summaries

First round
Friday, June 9, 1949

Source:

Second round
Saturday, June 10, 1949

Source:

Third round
Saturday, June 11, 1949 (morning)

Source:

Final round
Saturday, June 11, 1949 (afternoon)

Source:

References

External links

U.S. Open (golf)
Golf in Illinois
Medinah, Illinois
U.S. Open
U.S. Open
U.S. Open (g)
U.S. Open (g)